Mihr is a name of Persian origin that may refer to:

Given name 

 Emine Mihrişah Sultan (died 1732), French second concubine of Ottoman Sultan Ahmed III, and mother of Sultan Mustafa III
 Mihr-Mihroe (died 555), 6th century Sassanid general
 Mihrimah Sultan (c. 1522–1578), daughter of Ottoman Sultan Suleiman the Magnificent
 Mihrişah Sultan (c. 1745–1805), Genoese consort of Ottoman Sultan Mustafa III, and mother of Sultan Selim III
 Veh Mihr Shapur (died 442), the first marzban of Armenia
 Mihr-un-nissa Begum, daughter of Nur Jahan and wife of Shahryar Mirza
 Mihr-un-Nissa Begum (1661–1706), youngest daughter of Mughal Emperor Aurangzeb

Other
 Mihr (Armenian deity)

Persian words and phrases